Cyhexatin, also known as tricyclohexyltin hydroxide is an organometallic compound of tin with the chemical formula .

Properties
Cyhexatin forms colorless crystals or white crystalline powder. It is practically insoluble in water. The powder is wettable by water.

Reactions
Cyhexatin is stable in aqueous suspensions in neutral and alkaline conditions (pH above 6), but reacts exothermically with strong acids, acting as a base, to form salts. Reacts with strong oxidizers. Decomposes upon exposure to ultraviolet light to dicyclohexyltin oxide  (which is not an analog of ketones  because it exists as a polymer) and cyclohexylstannanoic acid . Contact with metals may emit flammable hydrogen gas. Upon heating above  it decomposes to bis(tricyclohexyltin) oxide , emitting irritating and toxic fumes and acrid smoke.

Uses
Cyhexatin is used in paints. In agriculture, cyhexatin is used as a pesticide against insects, as well as parasitic mites that attack plants, like vegetables (e.g. cucurbits), fruit trees (e.g. pome fruits, stone fruits), hops, walnut, strawberry, vines and ornamentals.

Hazards and toxicity
Cyhexatin is not combustible, but decomposes upon heating to produce corrosive and toxic fumes. Some components of those fumes are oxidizers, thus, they can cause combustible materials to ignite, like wood, oil, some plastics, paper and clothes. Containers of cyhexatin may explode when heated. Cyhexatin is very toxic to aquatic life.

Cyhexatin is not classified as a human carcinogen, but is classified as a teratogen. It is toxic by contact with skin, inhalation and ingestion. The compound and its fumes irritate and burn eyes. Contact with skin causes pruritus and burns. Cyhexatin can be absorbed into the body through the skin, and skin should be washed immediately upon contact with this chemical. Inhalation of its fumes causes irritation of the respiratory system, coughing, headache, dizziness and sore throat. It can cause abdominal pain, diarrhea, nausea and vomiting. It causes damage to kidneys and liver, as well as nervous system. Cyhexatin is a central nervous system depressant.

References 

Organotin compounds
Acaricides